Břetislav Rychlík (born 23 July 1958) is a Czech actor and director. He was born in Uherské Hradiště and began his career at the local theater. Later he worked in the theater in Brno and also taught at Janáček Academy of Music and Performing Arts. He also directed several documentary films.

Filmography
 Quiet Happiness (1985)
 Pětka s hvězdičkou (1985)
 Vojtěch, řečený sirotek (1989)
 Pražákům, těm je hej (1990)
 The Inheritance or Fuckoffguysgoodday (1992)
 …ani smrt nebere (1996)
 Dědictví aneb Kurva se neříká (2014)

External links

References 

1958 births
Living people
Czech male film actors
People from Uherské Hradiště
Czech film directors
20th-century Czech male actors
21st-century Czech male actors